Pren-gwyn is a small village in the  community of Llandysul, Ceredigion, Wales, which is 63.1 miles (101.6 km) from Cardiff and 182.5 miles (293.6 km) from London. Pren-gwyn is represented in the Senedd by Elin Jones (Plaid Cymru) and the Member of Parliament is Ben Lake (Plaid Cymru).

The name is derived from the Welsh language: "White wood".

See also
List of localities in Wales by population

References

Villages in Ceredigion
Llandysul